Nü Sensae is a Canadian punk and grunge trio from Vancouver composed of bassist-vocalist Andrea Lukic, drummer Daniel Pitout, and guitarist Brody McKnight. In 2012, Spin magazine named them in their list of top 5 best new artists. Nü Sensae are currently signed to Suicide Squeeze Records. Due to Pitout pursuing education in England, the group went on hiatus in August 2014.

History

The band was formed as a duo in 2008, by Andrea Lukic and Daniel Pitout. From 2008 to 2011 the band released several EP's on labels such as Fast Weapons, Deranged Records, Isolated Now Waves, Swill Children and Critiscum Internationale.

Nü Sensae released their first album, TV, Death And The Devil in 2010 on Nominal Records which was named one of the top 10 punk albums of the year by Exclaim! magazine. In September 2011, Nü Sensae announced the addition of guitarist Brody McKnight to the band. Their second album, "Sundowning", was released on August 7, 2012, via Suicide Squeeze Records and was given an 8.0 rating by Pitchfork Media.

Nü Sensae have also been associated with the queercore or queer rock genre, with the band's openly gay drummer, Daniel Pitout, having been featured in several gay publications and for his work in AIDS activism as founder of the AIDS Day Music Project (or ADMP). Pitout was named one of the most eligible gay bachelors of 2013 by OUT magazine. Pitout also performs masked as country singer Orville Peck.

Band members
Andrea Lukic – bass guitar, vocals
Brody McKnight – guitar
Daniel Pitout – drums

Discography

Albums

Singles and EPs

Various artist compilations

References

External links

Suicide Squeeze Records artists
Canadian punk rock groups
Musical groups from Vancouver
Musical groups established in 2008
2008 establishments in British Columbia